2ARM FM is a community radio station, first established in the late 1970s, broadcasting from Armidale, New England (New South Wales) Australia. The station maintains a 24/7 365 days a year service. 
Permanent Community Broadcasting 5-year term Licences have been granted in 2012 and 2017 after operating from 2007 on Temporary Community Broadcasting Licences (TCBL). These 2007 events included a 28 September 2007 letter of representation from Mr Tony Windsor MP for New England to Senator Helen Coonan Minister for Communications, Information Technology & the Arts.

The station has been broadcasting since the late 1970s to Armidale, Walcha, Uralla, Guyra and all areas in between.

It is volunteer based, and is a member of the Community Broadcasting Association of Australia (CBAA). Neighbouring CBAA affiliated community radio stations are now found at Bellingen, Glen Innes, Inverell, Kempsey, Grafton, Walcha, Tamworth, Taree, Tenterfield & Newcastle.

The current license holder is an Incorporated Association. The ABN is 30 635647271. In June, 2009, in consultation with station stakeholders & NSW Fair Trading, the application to NSW Fair Trading for a transfer of the existing NSW Co-operative to a NSW Incorporated Association was finalised.

History 
The earliest history of 2ARM is closely linked with that of 2UNE, the availability of FM technology for radio broadcasting and the not unrelated beginning of the community broadcasting sector of Australia. The first UNE students to broadcast, did so out the Armidale CBD studios of Armidale's commercial station 2AD until a studio and related equipment became available on campus.

Professor Neville Fletcher, physicist, a lecturer at the University of New England at the time, presented the idea of a campus radio station to the students, and this led to letters to the postmaster-general requesting a licence. Fletcher was born in Armidale in 1930 and has an entry in the Australian Academy of Science web page. He attended Armidale High School from 1942 to 1946. He later went to Harvard University, where he gained a PhD. He was professor of physics at UNE from 1963 to 1983.

The Radio UNE station was established through 1968–69, and utilised a "closed loop" system. Basically AM radio induction within buildings of the university. After a number of hurdles, a licence was granted to use this innovative system, and the station went to air as Radio UNE on 27 April 1970. The system allowed the broadcasts to be heard only inside the residential colleges at the University.

A good 8-page history of Community Radio in Australia can be located, compliments of Adelaide University at

In 1975 a letter was sent to the station, by the then Minister for the Media, Dr. Moss Cass,
regarding the expansion of the Community Broadcasting trial. The station was to be
offered an Experimental FM licence under the Wireless Telegraphy Act. The letter
concluded that all members of the community should be allowed to join in the broadcasting
activities of the station.

Radio UNE was then formed into a co-operative, the Radio UNE Co-Operative Ltd, which
would hold the licence. After some initial tests as 2UNE-FM, the station eventually went to
air in 1976 as 2ARM-FM, reflecting a wider community involvement. 2ARM-FM was officially opened by the then Armidale Mayor Peter Poggioli on Saturday 9 October 1976.

By 1977, the "pocket handkerchief-sized studios and offices are housed in the University of New England's Milton Building. At those times when a larger studio is required, arrangements are made to use the facility operated by the university's audio-visual unit, with which the station has an excellent working relationship."

In 1977, "The transmitter and aerial tower are located on a prominent hill 500 metres from the studios. The signal is carried by landline to the transmitter site. Transmitter switching is achieved by time clocks located in the transmitter hut...It is licensed to broadcast with an effective radiated power of 100 watts. However due to television interference problems, the station has been restricted to an output of 20 watts. The transmitter and stereo encoder were manufactured by the German Rohde & Schwarz corporation."

The licence holder was to be the University, but the station was established under the
auspice of the Students' Representative Council. Estimated income of $38,000 for the year ending 30 June 1977 showed the following details;
UNE Students Representative Council   $16,000,
Film Commission Creative Dev. Branch  $10,000,
Australia Council Music Board         $5,000,
Private Sponsors                      $3,050,
Corporate & Institutional Sponsors    $3,000,
University of New England             $1,000,
Sale of program guides                $105,
Donations                             $125.

Keith Jackson became the first co-ordinator in 1976. He wrote a 33-page booklet "Community Radio in Armidale 1977." A copy is available at the National Library of Australia. In 1997 with others he published in English & Indonesian, "Manage by the moment - A handbook for radio managers." A copy of this book is available at the Australian Film Television and Radio School. An overview of Keith's career is at radioinfo.com.au. On Australia Day 2004, Keith became a member of the Order of Australia in recognition of his forty years in the communications industry, both in Australia and in the Asia-Pacific region and for service to management and training in the media, communications and public relations fields and to the development of non-commercial radio services. Jackson told radioinfo; "I was delighted to get this award. It reinforced for me that communications is a team game and that the best results are usually team driven."

The service that was provided by 2ARM was different to that provided under the closed loop licence, but the Co-Operative ran both services. In the early years & well into the 1980s, 2ARM transmitted on FM92.3. 2ARM FM 92.1 currently transmits on FM92.1 and is able to be routinely received, to a range of approximately 70 kilometres in every direction from Armidale. Weather patterns can lead to exceptional distances - such as "down the hill" at Sawtell or "across the ditch" at New Zealand. The new technology associated with an internet streaming capacity is increasingly available & in 2017 dedicated listeners have picked up members of our live and local announcers team, in locations such as Fiji and South Africa.

During 1978, sixteen experimental licenses, including one held by Radio UNE Co-operative Ltd, issued under the commonwealth's, Wireless Telegraphy Act lapsed. Provision for the licensing of community radio stations was now solely, pursuant to Part IIIB of the commonwealth's Broadcasting and Television Act. Now the Commonwealth Broadcasting Act 1992.

The then Minister for Post and Telecommunications, published notices inviting applications for the grant of 26 licenses in 15 areas around Australia. The first grant of such a license was to 2WEB in Bourke. The Minister's notice for the Armidale license was published on 14 April 1978. In a sense this date is like the birth certificate for Armidale community radio and followed a period of gestation at the University of New England. There is a famous speech by Minister Tony Staley in the Federal Parliament on 5 April 1978 about Community Broadcasting

In July 1978 the Australian Broadcasting Tribunal facilitated a public inquiry in Armidale involving an application for a category "C" license. This was only the third hearing in Australia for such a license. In the opening paragraph of the transcript of the hearing, held in Armidale, the Chair Mr Bruce Gyngell AO (1929 - 2000) made the following remarks; "We are at the threshold of a new and challenging era in Australian broadcasting. The essence of public (community) broadcasting is the fulfilment of a community need for alternative programming which the national and commercial broadcasting sectors are not able to provide. Public broadcasting should be seen as a force for diversity - a means of providing the community with a wider range of alternative programming choices. To achieve this, public broadcasters will necessarily have to enter into a symbiotic relationship with their respective service audiences and communities. The quality of such a relationship should be evident in the programme philosophy of public broadcasters."

In 1979, after much disagreement, Radio UNE returned to the operations of the SRC,
while the Co-Operative moved, with the new 2ARM Community Licence, into the City of Armidale.

On 5 November 1979, the change of name to Armidale Community Radio Co-operative Limited from Radio U.N.E. Co-operative Limited was registered.

On 30 April 1981, the then federal minister for Communications Mr Ian Sinclair fielded a question about the status of community radio stations in Australia including Armidale Community radio. The question and answer was recorded in Hansard.

Later, the NSW Associations Incorporation Act 1984 became an option for organising community causes.

In 1985, Agricultural Economics student at the University of New England and Robb College tutor, Tom Murrell initiated and hosted Rural Comment, a weekly rural current affairs show, with the first interview being with local politician Ian Sinclair.

During the years 1980 to 1993, Phil Godfrey was the 2ARM-FM country music presenter. Phil was awarded life membership for services to community radio in Armidale. From 1997 to 2018, Phil continued with the cause of community radio in Dargaville New Zealand. He is a patron of Northern Wairoa Community Radio Trust and life member of Big River FM.

In June 1996, Mr Neville Graham, with 30-year experience in radio and television, was recruited as Co-ordinator of the station, by the Co-operative's Directors to renew the fortunes of Armidale's Community Radio Station following wide spread recession in the New England and the introduction in New England of ABC's classic FM radio as a competing source of classical music in and about Armidale. Neville provided leadership in difficult years and later continued his radio career in Newcastle.

In the late 1990s, Rebecca Henschke, as an Armidale-based school girl attending Duval High School, presented a breakfast program and later an afternoon program "School's Out" which included requests and talk back. The experience was so enjoyable Rebecca decided to aim for a career in Journalism. By 2002, Rebecca was a fourth year student Journalism and International Studies at the University of Technology Sydney. In that year Rebecca was awarded the Don Carr-Brown Memorial Scholarship by ABC New England. The award honours contributions of Don Carr-Brown who was one of the most highly regarded journalists and broadcasters in the North of NSW. The scholarship was valued at $3,000. By 2018, at age 37, Rebecca Henschke was BBC Indonesia Bureau Chief having reported from Indonesia for 12 years.  Dr Mark Henschke OAM is a proud dad and former long time Armidale resident, who continues to give back to the community in many ways, including through medical education.

The radio station applied to have its licence renewed in 2007, but was rejected by the ACMA for failing to show community participations in both the operations and the decision making of the station. The then Station Manager was also the main on-air presenter, and resigned. (See notes below.)

The station was then allowed to remain on-air with a Temporary Community Broadcasting Licence (TCBL) until 2012 when it was issued a full five-year license valid until 4/3/2017.

In 2009 the station became an Incorporated Association, and moved to a new location at 128 Kentucky Street in February 2010. This site has direct line of sight to the transmission tower located at the top of Lynland Park Estate abutting other communications industry towers. With the Old Teachers' College, Armidale to the North & the annual Black Gully music festival to the south east the neighbourhood is establishing itself as a cultural quarter of Armidale.

In about 2011 a new transmission tower was commissioned with Armidale Regional Council development consent.

In about December 2012 registration commenced and has continued with the ACNC - Australian Charities and Not for Profits Commission also known as the National Charities regulator which was established in about December 2012.

A number of interesting Tall Trees are present in the vicinity. They include the Manna Gum Eucalyptus viminalis, the Casuarina, Melia azedarach, the Monkey Puzzle Tree Araucaria araucana, Cedrus atlantica, Wollemia, Sequoia sempervirens, elm trees Ulmus procera, Quercus palustris, Silver Birches once very popular in Melbourne Betula pendula and others. They contribute to the sense of budding botanical gardens - such as are highly valued in some other regional towns such as Queens Park, Toowoomba & Tamworth, New South Wales. An appreciation of tall trees in the northern tablelands region is particularly significant as it is the watershed land for some mighty rivers including the Gwydir and Macleay river catchments. Also near by and to the south west are located the Armidale Arboretum and Beadle Grove. Near to Beadle Grove is a rare "Fringe Tree" Chionanthus virginicus, a very attractive flowering tree. Beadle Grove is in memory of the Foundation Professor of Botany at UNE. There are many major national parks in the broader New England region. A special lookout near Ebor Falls is Point Lookout. The point where the Macleay River originates can be viewed from a National Park reached via Hillgrove. A special memorial grove in honour of a significant early Australian forester, Mr Norman Jolly (1882 - 1954) can be visited to the north west of Dorrigo at the Nymboi Binderay National Park. For the busy visitor, one must not miss out on the inspirational and majestic tall trees, scientifically labeled and maintained at Central Park Armidale.

In 2013, Armidale celebrated 150 years of local government. A 280-page book was published to commemorate this. In the chapter on Serving the Community, then Station Manager Kathy Padgen after consultation, was invited to provide a submission on behalf of Armidale Community Radio. This submission was incorporated into the final publication.

In 2014, NSW Co-operative Laws merged into a National Co-operative Law.

In about 2015 Armidale City Council was able to improve the car park surface at 128 Kentucky Street and in 2017 the new Armidale Regional Council was able to improve the street lighting at 128 Kentucky Street

In July 2016, a newly constructed transmission hut was commissioned.

On 19 July 2017, the regulator Australian Communications and Media Authority,(A.C.M.A.), issued a new 5-year broadcasting license, with contemporary conditions, until 4 March 2022.

At the 2018 Annual General Meeting, two long serving members and announcers were awarded life memberships for services to community radio in Armidale. They were Dr Margaret Sharpe and Mr Peter Beaton. Known life members up to this date include Phil Godfrey, Robert Hoad, Dr Margaret Sharpe & Peter Beaton.

At August 2018, of the 97 community radio stations operating in NSW, 67 operate as an incorporated association. A long list of community groups organise for community announcements to be read out on radio by the station's live and local announcers. For many years on Friday mornings, opportunities have been provided for live interviews. The station now streams and has a website 2arm.net.au containing a program guide, membership form and other station details.

At the 2019 Annual General Meeting, in October 2019, three long serving members, presenters & committee members were awarded life memberships for services to community radio in Armidale. They were Sandy Sweeney, Susan Lawson & Kathy Padgen. Known life members up to this date now total seven. During 2019 the main studio was upgraded with broad based support & the current committee members are detailed on the Australian Charities & Not For Profits Commission at www.acnc.gov.au or. Another year of very good standard of broadcasting 24/7-year round, was maintained with the continuing passionate support of CBAA, CBF, and the many community groups, volunteers, members, sponsors and loyal listeners.

At the 2020 Annual General Meeting, the membership met on Monday 26 October 2020 at the main meeting room of the Armidale Bowling Club. Geoff Lawson was unanimously awarded a life membership for services to community radio in Armidale. Geoff was inducted at the pre Christmas committee meeting held at the station offices & studios in Kentucky Street. The committee & membership have navigated during 2020, the extreme weather of January & February 2020 with associated water restrictions, the evolving best practices of covid safe operations, technical improvements, participation in a virtual CBAA annual conference of 28 October to 31 October & together delivered a very good standard of community radio broadcasting 24/7 for our loyal listeners. Some good skills are being applied by a good number of community radio enthusiasts, with a view to renewing our capacities & staying true to the Community Radio Charter during the 2020s - the fifth decade of our operations.

In May 2021, at the Armidale Regional Council annual Volunteer Awards ceremonies; Michael Kean was recognised for his contribution to Armidale Community Radio. The award was for the Adult Volunteer of the Year - 25–64 years. The citation included "Michael has helped the station adapt to changes in technology and is working on ensuring the station stays relevant through introducing podcasting and smart speakers. He has also facilitated the replacement of ageing studio equipment. Michael is also being recognised for his outstanding work coming up with solutions during the Covid-19 lockdown when announcers had to work from home."

18 October 2021, has been firmed up by the Armidale Community Radio management committee as the date for the next Annual General Meeting. Membership renewals are currently being processed. Some good reports were provided to the membership and a further association life member, Mr Peter Crick, was endorsed by the membership. Ms Pip Spilsbury, Broadcasting License Co-ordinator also addressed the meeting. The management structure including two co-managers is set to continue into the coming year. Reporting by this station to the ACNC was attended to in a timely fashion.  Reporting by other stations, for comparison and related purposes,  is becoming increasingly transparent with the assistance of this ACNC regulator. Audience reach surveying continues from time to time and the latest is available at the CBAA website. 

On 23 December 2021, the regulator Australian Communications and Media Authority, (A.C.M.A), issued from their offices at The Bay Centre 65 Pirrama Rd Pyrmont NSW 2009, a new 5 year broadcasting license with contemporary conditions until 4 March 2027.

On 1 September 2022, a new Incorporated Associations Regulation 2022 (NSW) commenced. More information is available at the NSW Fair Trading website. Business as usual discussions about progressing & establishing a NSW charitable fundraising authority, as the station grows it's activities are being held. More detail about this area of regulation is available through the CBAA website. 

Monday 26 September 2022, the day after the Geelong Cats won the AFL premiership with 100,000 spectators filling the MCG, is firmed up by the Armidale Community Radio management committee as the date of the next Annual General Meeting. A good number of membership renewals have been processed and some good reports to the membership are anticipated. A management structure inclusive of a paid part-time manager is also set to begin at about this time. 2022 also saw robust initiatives from the leadership team in relation to accredited training integrated with an experienced trainer and the Community Media Training Authority.   

In the lead up to Christmas 2022 and as part of growing our loyal listenership;
installation of a modern back-up power supply was installed, prompted by the annual CBAA conference taking place - virtual participation in the conference and the conference proceedings via our CBAA membership was encouraged, a renewal of a traditional NSW fundraising authority, for Armidale Community Radio, was accepted by the responsible NSW regulator,  the station manager attended the AGM of the friends of the ABC - Armidale branch, at "Kent & Hughes House" Faulkner Street Armidale, an initiative involving use of outside broadcasting equipment, live interviews & live to air transmission of the post covid-19 Black Gully Music Festival at Kentucky Street, was trialed on Saturday 12 November 2022 and the management committee wishes all of our loyal listeners, generous sponsors, skilled announcers, diverse volunteers, absent friends & other stake-holders a happy & safe Summer, Christmas & New Year 2023, as we advance together further into this decade of the 2020s..

Technical data 
Frequency - 92.1FM

Licensed Power - 2 Kw.

Notes and references 

 Investigation Report 
 Submission of 2UNE to Senate Committee

External links 
  2ARM FM 92.1 Website
  CBAA website
  2ARM Gains TCBL
  Call for more members

Community radio stations in Australia
Radio stations in New South Wales
Armidale
Radio stations established in 1976